Alfred Smith (4 October 1908 – 17 January 1989) was an Australian cricketer. He played two first-class matches for Western Australia between 1925/26 and 1926/27.

See also
 List of Western Australia first-class cricketers

References

External links
 

1908 births
1989 deaths
Australian cricketers
Western Australia cricketers
Cricketers from Melbourne